Brian Roche may refer to:

 Brian Roche (American football) (born 1973), American football tight end
 Brian Roche (business executive), New Zealand business executive
 Brian Roche (hurler), Irish hurler
 Brian Roche (rugby union), Irish rugby union player and coach

See also
 Bryan Róchez, Honduran footballer